Gandhi Medical College (founded 14 September 1954) is a medical college in Hyderabad, India affiliated with Kaloji Narayana Rao University of Health Sciences. The college was originally affiliated to NTR University of Health Sciences.

History 

Gandhi Medical College, originally named People's Medical College, was founded on 14 September 1954. It was located at Humayun nagar close to the present-day Sarojini Devi Eye Hospital. It was opened because the original medical college in the area, Osmania Medical College, was unable to keep up with the demands for physicians in the State. Dr. Syed Nizamuddin Ahmed was the first principal and the founder of the college.

Officially it was inaugurated on 25 June 1955 by the first president of India, Rajendra Prasad.

By 1956, the college was in financial trouble, and the government of Hyderabad agreed to take it over and develop it.

In 1958, the college was moved to Basheerbagh. The old building has since been demolished. In 2003, the college moved to its new premises in Musheerabad. The new facility, along with a hospital, was constructed on the area that formerly housed the Musheerabad Jail.

Initially the teaching hospital for the college was an infirmary that opened in 1851 with funds from philanthropists, and was named KEM Hospital in honor of King Edward VII. The hospital was renamed Gandhi Hospital in 1958. At that time nearly all the heads of units were British trained.

From 1954 to 2003, a total of 6090 students were admitted to the MBBS course. The number of students admitted ranged between a minimum of 42 in 1954 to a maximum of 224 in 1968. In 1970, there were no admissions.

In the late 1950s and 1960s, the college and hospital were consolidated.

In the 1970s there was a growth in so-called "super specialties" such as cardiology, cardio-thoracic surgery, neurology and neurosurgery.

Academics 
Courses offered by the institute include:
Bachelor of Medicine and Surgery (MBBS)
Bachelors in Physical Therapy (BPT)
Doctor of Medicine/Master of Surgery (MD/MS)
Doctor of Medicine/MCh
Bachelor of Science (BSc) courses in nursing, paramedical and medical specialities

250 students per year are admitted to study for MBBS degrees. There are also 88 postgraduate students admitted per year, including those in clinical, non-clinical and super specialty subjects. Students can earn one of 37 degrees in various branches of medicine. Since 2013 the number of undergraduate seats has been increased from 150 to 200.

Departments of the college include anatomy, physiology, biochemistry, forensic medicine, microbiology, pathology, pharmacology and community medicine. The college plays host to several academic and cultural events throughout the year, such as medical conferences, workshops and quizzes. Some of these include Gandhi Orthopaedic Education (GOE) and AEGIS.

The final-year students of the college also publish an annual college magazine, which is a collection of articles, photographs, artwork and other content created by the professors and students of the college.

Hospital departments

The GMH is a 1,200-bed facility and each year performs about 80,000 outpatient consultations, 42,000 inpatient admissions, 15,000 minor operations, and 11,000 major operations.

The hospital is divided into 27 departments:

General Medicine
General Surgery
Pediatrics
Orthopedics
Anesthesia
Dermatology
Leprosy
Sexually Transmitted Disease
Ophthalmology
 E.N.T. & Head and Neck Surgery
 Radiodiagnosis
 Casualty
Blood Bank
Cardiology
Neurology
Nephrology
Gastroenterology
Endocrinology
Cardiothoracic surgery
Neurosurgery
Pediatric Surgery
Plastic Surgery
Urology
 TB Clinic
 Dental
OB/GYN
Psychiatry
Hospital Administration

Principals

Dr. Syed Nizamuddin Ahmed (founder and first principal): 01/05/1954 - 01/07/1956
Dr. Bankat Chandra: 02/07/1956 - 03/05/1957
Dr. D. V. Subba Reddy: 04/05/1957 - 29/01/1959
Dr. G.C.S. Naidu: 30/01/1959 - 21/12/1959
Dr. Mohammad Yousufuddin Ansari: 22/12/1959 - 28/03/1963
Dr. B.S. Surt: 28/03/1963 - 15/06/1967
Dr. G.P. Ramayya: 29/08/1967 - 28/05/1968
Dr. G. Narshing Rao: 1970 - 1974
Dr. S. Ramchander Rao: 1976 - 1976
Dr. Kameshwari Devi: 1977 - 1977
Dr. Y. Jaya: 1974 - 1978
Dr. Sanku. Ramchander Rao: 1976 - 1976 
Dr. U. Brahmaji Rao: 01/03/1983 - 24/05/1983
Dr. C. Shyamala Bhaskaran: 24/05/1983 - 30/10/1990
Dr. Lily N. Ebenezer: 31/10/1990 - 08/08/1991
Dr. G. Shyam Sunder: 07/08/1991 - 03/09/1993
Dr. V.V. Satyanarayana: 31/03/1994 - 06/05/1994
Dr. B.C. Mathur: 05/09/1994 - 31/07/1995
Dr. T.E. Kasturi: 01/08/1995 - 30/09/1996
Dr. K. Shantha Kumari : 01/01/1997 - 31/05/1998
Dr. K. Gopal Singh: 29/06/1998 - 03/09/1998
Dr. Farhatunnisa: 04/09/1998 - 31/01/1999
Dr. P. Vijaya Lakshmi: 31/03/1999 - 30/09/1999
Dr. P. Shyam Sunder: 02/04/2000 - 30/07/2000
Dr. Neena Devi: 01/08/2000 - 31/01/2001
Dr. K. Prameela Devi: 04/03/2001 - 31/08/2001
Dr. T.S.S. Lakshmi: 04/09/2001 - 16/11/2001
Dr. Meenakshi: 16/11/2001 - 31/12/2002
Dr. C.A. Aruna: 01/10/2003 - 23/11/2003
Dr. K.V. Raghava Rao: 28/11/2003 - 30/04/2004
Dr. Kishore Roy
Dr. Sikander Hayath
Dr. Sudha Ramana
Dr. A.Y.Chary
Dr. Aravind Kumar
Dr. Pradeep Deshpande
Dr. Sidirala Narasimha Rao
Dr. K.Venkatesh 
Dr. Badeti Srinivasa Rao
Dr. Ashok Kumar
Dr. Sreelatha
Dr. B. S. V. Manjula
Dr. O. Shravan Kumar (current)

Gandhi Medical College Global Alliance

In 2005 alumni of GMC living in the United States founded the non-profit corporation Gandhi Medical College Global Alliance (GMCGA). This organization's goals are both educational and charitable, with a strong emphasis on fostering kinship among alumni living in other countries.

The accomplishments of GMCGA (sometimes in collaboration with the GMC Alumni Association back in Hyderabad) include construction of an alumni education center, providing study facilities, establishing an American Heart Association accredited cardiac life support training center, setting up electronic library services, donating needed equipment, youth volunteer programs, a free meal program for patient attendants in a shelter associated with Gandhi Hospital, support of the palliative care program in collaboration with Roshni organization, and assisting both medical students and faculty by providing student scholarships, gold medals, and teacher recognition awards.

Alumni
 Sailakshmi Balijepally - Surgeon and charity founder

References

External links

 Official website 

Medical colleges in Telangana
Universities and colleges in Hyderabad, India
Heritage structures in Hyderabad, India
Educational institutions established in 1954
1954 establishments in India
Buildings and structures in Secunderabad